HS Koningin Regentes ("Queen Regent") was a Dutch hospital ship that was torpedoed by the Imperial German Navy submarine  on 6 June 1918 while returning to Rotterdam, the Netherlands, from Boston, Lincolnshire, England.

Construction 
HS Koningin Regentes was built as the paddle steamer PSS Koningin Regentes at the Fairfield Shipbuilding & Engineering Co. Ltd. shipyard in Govan, Scotland, in 1895. She was launched on 9 July 1895, and completed later that year.

Early career 
The Koningin Regentes was used as a ferry boat between the Netherlands and the United Kingdom until the outbreak of World War I. She sometimes also carried mail as cargo.

World War I 
After World War I began, Koningin Regentes was refitted with special accommodations and repainted for service as a hospital ship. Her name was therefore also changed to HS Koningin Regentes. The Koningin Regentes now served on a new route between Rotterdam, the Netherlands,  and Boston, Lincolnshire, England, and operated on this route for nearly the entire war.

Sinking 
On 6 June 1918 Koningin Regentes departed Boston bound for Rotterdam. Seven people lost their lives in the sinking and the survivors were saved soon after.

Wreck 
It lies close to an English drilling site, and the sea floor is level with only sand and shells; visibility is also very good. One of the ship′s steam engines lies on top of the ship and her decks have collapsed and are under a lot of sand.

References

1895 ships
Passenger ships of the Netherlands
World War I ships of the Netherlands
Hospital ships in World War I
Paddle steamers
Ships built on the River Clyde
Maritime incidents in 1918
World War I shipwrecks in the North Sea
Ships sunk by German submarines in World War I
World War I crimes by Imperial Germany